Sökmen is a Turkish given name or surname. Notable persons with that name include:

Given name
 Sökmen (Artuqid) (died 1104), Turkish bey
 Sökmen el-Kutbî (died 1111), Turkish bey
 Sökmen II (died 1185), Turkish ruler

Surname
 Ayhan Sökmen (1929–2013), Turkish physician
 İhsan Sökmen (1873–1955), Turkish soldier and politician 
 Tayfur Sökmen (1892–1980), Turkish politician

See also
 Sökmen, Çivril

Turkish-language surnames
Turkish masculine given names